Najat Maalla M'jid is a Moroccan pediatrician who serves as the United Nations Special Representative of the Secretary-General on Violence against Children. She was appointed to the role by Secretary-General of the United Nations António Guterres in May 2019. M'jid previously served as the Special Rapporteur on the sale of children, child prostitution and child pornography from 2008 to 2014.

Early life and education 
M'jid studied medicine at the University of Bordeaux and received a doctorate in general medicine from the University of Rabat. She also received a master's in human rights from the Human Rights Institute in Switzerland.

Career 
After university, M'jid worked as a doctor and became the Head of the Pediatric Department and Director of the Hay Hassani Mother-Child hospital in Casablanca. She founded the Non-governmental organization Bayti, which works with homeless youth in Morocco.

M'jid has served as a member of the Moroccan National Council on Human Rights and the Board of the African Child Policy Forum.

References 

Living people
Year of birth missing (living people)
Mohammed V University alumni
Moroccan diplomats
Moroccan expatriates in France
Moroccan officials of the United Nations
Moroccan physicians
Moroccan women diplomats
Moroccan women physicians
Neonatologists
Pediatricians
Special Representatives of the Secretary-General of the United Nations
United Nations special rapporteurs
University of Bordeaux alumni
Women pediatricians